Ribes velutinum is a species of currant known by the common name desert gooseberry.

Distribution
It is endemic to the deserts and mountains of the Western United States. It is native to areas in Montana, Idaho, Washington, Oregon, Utah, Nevada, California, and Arizona),

It grows in many types of habitat, including sagebrush scrub, pinyon-juniper woodland, and  yellow pine forest.

Description
Ribes velutinum is a spreading shrub with a thick, arching, multibranched stem growing up to 2 meters (80 inches) long. Nodes along the stems are armed with spines which may reach 2 centimeters (0.8 inch) in length. These are spines, not prickles, as they are derived from leaf material rather than from the plant epidermis (skin).

The thick, leathery leaves have generally rounded blades divided shallowly into three or five lobes and dotted with glandular hairs. The small blades are borne on petioles.

The inflorescence is a solitary flower or raceme of up to four flowers. Each small flower is a tube of white or yellowish sepals with smaller, similarly colored petals inside. The bloom period is April and May.

The fruit is an edible berry one half to one centimeter (0.2-0.4 inch) wide which ripens yellow, then reddish or purple.

Varieties
 Ribes velutinum var. goodingii —  Gooding's gooseberry,  endemic to the Great Basin region in California, Nevada, Idaho, Washington, Oregon.

References

External links
Jepson Manual eFlora (TJM2) treatment of Ribes velutinum
Missouri Botanical Garden: herbarium specimen (1905)
UC Calphotos gallery: Ribes velutinum images

velutinum
Endemic flora of the United States
Flora of California
Flora of the Northwestern United States
Flora of the Southwestern United States
Flora of the Great Basin
Flora of the Sierra Nevada (United States)
Flora of the California desert regions
Natural history of the Mojave Desert
Plants described in 1885
Taxa named by Edward Lee Greene
Flora without expected TNC conservation status